János Csaba Hahn (born 15 March 1995) is a Hungarian professional footballer who plays as a forward for Paks.

International career
On 1 June 2021, Hahn was included in the final 26-man squad to represent Hungary at the rescheduled UEFA Euro 2020 tournament. He debuted for Hungary in a friendly 1–0 win over Cyprus on 4 June 2021.

Career statistics

References

External links
HLSZ
MLSZ
 

1995 births
Hungarian people of German descent
People from Szekszárd
Sportspeople from Tolna County
Living people
Hungarian footballers
Hungary youth international footballers
Hungary international footballers
Association football forwards
Paksi FC players
Puskás Akadémia FC players
FC DAC 1904 Dunajská Streda players
Nemzeti Bajnokság II players
Nemzeti Bajnokság I players
Slovak Super Liga players
UEFA Euro 2020 players
Hungarian expatriate footballers
Expatriate footballers in Slovakia
Hungarian expatriate sportspeople in Slovakia